Gachu may refer to:

Gachu, Bastak, the village in Bastak County
Gachu, Sistan and Baluchestan, the village in Sistan and Baluchestan Province